A MetaServer is a central broker providing a collated view (similar to a database view) for dispersed web resources. It is used to collect data from various web services, web pages, databases, or other online resources/repositories and then present the combined results to the client using a standard web protocol (e.g. HTTP with HTML, REST, SOAP, XML-RPC, etc.).

Styles of use
The purpose of such a system is to provide one or several of the following:
 a unified view on multiple resources
 easy comparison of the data
 standardized access to different repositories
 calibration of the data
 determining the data consensus

Example MetaServer projects
Typical, widespread implementations of MetaServers are:
 Meta-Search-Engines
 DNS MetaServers
 Protein Structure and Function Prediction Gateways
 Computer Game MetaServers
 Text Mining MetaServers (e.g. BioCreative Metaserver - BCMS)

Enterprise application integration
Internet architecture